The cinema of moral anxiety, was a short-lived (1976-1981) but influential movement in the history of the cinema of Poland. The term was also translated as "cinema of moral unrest", "cinema of moral concern", "cinema of moral dissent".<ref name=maha>Marek Haltof, The Cinema of Krzysztof Kieslowski: Variations on Destiny and Chance", Preface</ref> Films of this movement portrayed the crisis of the regime in Communist Poland, usually in the setting of a provincial town. The development of the movement was abruptly stopped by the introduction of the martial law in Poland in 1981, and when it was lifted, the country was overwhelmed with powerful political and social processes which had eventually led to the fall of Communism in the country and disappearance of the addressed social issues.

In addition,   suggested the term "kino autentyzmu etosu" (cinema of ethos authenticity), while Mariola Jankun-Dopartowa suggested "kino nieufności" (Cinema of Distrust).

Style
The style of the film may be demonstrated by one of the closing scenes of the film Camera Buff by Krzysztof Kieślowski: a single-take panogamic shot from nice facades of a row of houses to an alleyway, to dilapidated rear sides of the houses. Films of this kind did not have much drama, political machinations, or corruption. The problems of the regime were often exposed by showing stagnant lives of average people, with their struggles to earn the means for living in minimal comfort. In these films personal interests conflict with the stifling social and political environment.

Film directors and films
Piotr Andrejew
Filip Bajon
Feliks Falk 
Agnieszka HollandProvincial Actors 
Krzysztof Kieślowski
 1976: The Scar (1976 film) 1977: From a Night Porter's Point of View, documentary
 1979: Camera Buff 1980: The CalmJanusz Kijowski 

Barbara Sass
Andrzej Wajda
1977: Man of Marble1978: Without Anesthesia1980: The Orchestra Conductor Krzysztof Zanussi 
1977: Camouflage1980: The Constant FactorJanusz Zaorski
Tomasz Zygadło
1980: The MothSee also
Polish Film School

References

Further reading
Marcin Maron, "Head of Medusa or realism in films of the Cinema of Moral Anxiety", translated from Kwartalnik Filmowy, Special Issue 2013: “Polish Film Scholars on Polish Cinema”
Кино морального беспокойства: гости Елены Фанайловой обсуждают ретроспективу польского кино, April 4, 2020, Radio Liberty'', Russian

Cinema of Poland
Movements in cinema
Polish People's Republic